Elachista ozeini is a moth of the family Elachistidae that is endemic to  Italy.

References

ozeini
Moths described in 2004
Moths of Europe
Endemic fauna of Italy